State Correctional Institution – Laurel Highlands is a minimum-security facility located on State Route 31, about three miles east of the Somerset Interchange of the Pennsylvania Turnpike, about 70 miles southeast of Pittsburgh. SCI – Laurel Highlands houses minimum-security inmates, particularly older males and geriatric/mentally ill males.

History
SCI – Laurel Highlands is on the campus of the former Somerset State Hospital, which closed in mid-1995. The facility was then converted into its current facility and opened in 1996.

Notable inmates
John du Pont – murdered Olympic gold-medalist Dave Schultz. Du Pont died in prison in 2010.
Ira Einhorn – nicknamed The Unicorn Killer, he evaded justice for over two decades before being extradited from France in 2001 to stand trial for the 1977 murder of his girlfriend Holly Maddux. Einhorn died in prison on April 2, 2020.
Tom Druce – former Pennsylvania State Representative
George Feigley
Scott Ritter – intelligence officer and sex offender
Jerry Sandusky – retired college football coach and serial child molester

See also
List of Pennsylvania state prisons

References

External links
 State Correctional Institution – Laurel Highlands

Prisons in Pennsylvania
Buildings and structures in Somerset County, Pennsylvania
1996  establishments in Pennsylvania